William R. McKeen Jr. was the inventor of the track motorcar. While serving as the superintendent of motive power and machinery for the Union Pacific he developed the McKeen railmotor, later launching the McKeen Motor Car Company at the insistence of UP head E.H. Harriman. His company was located at the Union Pacific Railroad Omaha Shops Facility in Omaha, Nebraska.

See also
 History of Omaha

References

Year of birth missing
Year of death missing
20th-century American railroad executives
Businesspeople from Omaha, Nebraska
Union Pacific Railroad people